Willie Clarke (born 13 October 1966) is an Irish republican politician from Northern Ireland. He was elected to the Northern Ireland Assembly in 2003 as a Sinn Féin member for South Down. He has been a member of Down District Council since 2001.

On 21 February 2012, he announced he would resign as an MLA to concentrate on his work as a Down District councillor. In April 2012, party colleague Chris Hazzard succeeded him as MLA.

References

1966 births
Living people
Politicians from County Down
Sinn Féin MLAs
Northern Ireland MLAs 2003–2007
Northern Ireland MLAs 2007–2011
Northern Ireland MLAs 2011–2016
Sinn Féin councillors in Northern Ireland
Members of Down District Council